Anthony Chong (born 26 November 1940) is a Malaysian athlete. He competed in the men's long jump at the 1968 Summer Olympics.

References

External links
 

1940 births
Living people
Athletes (track and field) at the 1968 Summer Olympics
Malaysian male long jumpers
Olympic athletes of Malaysia
People from Sabah
Place of birth missing (living people)